Steganiodes is a genus of moths of the family Noctuidae. The genus was erected by George Hampson in 1910.

Species
Steganiodes albertina Hacker, Fiebig & Stadie, 2019 Uganda
Steganiodes mesophaea Hampson, 1910 Benin, Liberia, southern Nigeria, Gabon, Tanzania, Uganda

References

Acontiinae